The Andaman boobook or Andaman hawk-owl (Ninox affinis) is a species of owl in the family Strigidae. It is endemic to the Andaman Islands.

Its natural habitats are subtropical or tropical moist lowland forest and subtropical or tropical mangrove forest. It is becoming rare due to habitat loss.

Gallery

References

Andaman boobook
Birds of the Andaman Islands
Andaman boobook
Andaman boobook
Taxonomy articles created by Polbot